Schultens is the surname for a number of notable individuals.

Albert Schultens (1686-1750), Dutch philologist
Jennifer Schultens (born 1965), American mathematician
John James Schultens (1716-1778), Dutch orientalist
Henry Albert Schultens (1749-1793), Dutch linguist

See also